"Eveline" is a short story by the Irish writer James Joyce. It was first published in 1904 by the journal Irish Homestead and later featured in his 1914 collection of short stories Dubliners. It tells the story of Eveline, a teenager who plans to leave Dublin for Argentina with her lover.

The story 
A young woman, Eveline, of about nineteen years of age sits by her window, waiting to leave home. She muses on the aspects of her life that are driving her away, while "in her nostrils was the odor of dusty cretonne". Her mother has died as has her older brother Ernest.  Her remaining brother, Harry, is on the road "in the church decorating business". She fears that her father will beat her as he used to beat her brothers and she has little loyalty for her sales job. She has fallen for a sailor named Frank who promises to take her with him to Buenos Aires. Before leaving to meet Frank, she hears an organ grinder outside, which reminds her of a melody that played on an organ on the day her mother died and the promise she made to her mother to look after the home. At the dock where she and Frank are ready to embark on a ship together, Eveline is deeply conflicted and makes the painful decision not to leave with him.  Nonetheless, her face registers no emotion at all.

Like other tales in Dubliners, such as "Araby", "Eveline" features a circular journey, where a character decides to go back to where their journey began and where the result of their journey is disappointment and reluctance to travel.

References

External links
 Full text

External links
 

Short stories by James Joyce
1914 short stories